Lažec is a village in the municipality of Bitola, North Macedonia.

Demographics
According to the 1467-68 Ottoman defter, Lažec had families who displayed mixed Albanian and Slavic anthroponymy, with instances of individuals bearing both Slavic and Albanian names (e.g., Gjon Cvetko). The names are: Nikolla Muzak, Pejo Muzak, Lek-o, Arbanas (t.Arnaut), Todor Leko, Stojk-o Progon, Nikolla Gjin-i, Gjin Loja-o, Bard-i, Arbanas (t. Arnaut), Gjin Bard-i, Jovan Bard-i, Dimitri Bard-i Nikolla Arbanas (t. Arnaut), Dimitri Gjinguri, Pejo Gjinguri, Nikolla Gjinguri, Pron-ko, Progon-i, Miho Gjergj- i, Gjon Cvetko, Pejo Zoj-in, Gjurgjo-Zoin, Dimitri Kalojani, Petr Kaslojani, Dimitri Petro, Dimitri- Dojçe-in, Lazor (no patronym), Gjergj Miho.

In statistics gathered by Vasil Kanchov in 1900, the village of Lažec was inhabited by 340 Christian Bulgarians and 400 Muslim Albanians.

According to the statistics of Geographers Dimitri Mitsev and D. M. Brancoff, the town had a total Christian population of 360 in 1905, of which all were Patriarchist Bulgarians.

According to the 2002 census, the village had a total of 302 inhabitants. Ethnic groups in the village include:

Macedonians 161
Albanians 135
Serbs 4 
Others 2

References

Villages in Bitola Municipality
Villages in North Macedonia
Albanian communities in North Macedonia